Eois paulona is a moth in the  family Geometridae. Eois paulona is most often found in the eastern region of the Andes mountain range.

References

Moths described in 1927
Eois
Moths of South America